The Porsche V10 engine is a naturally-aspirated, V-10, internal combustion piston engine, designed and developed by Porsche, originally as a concept design for Formula One motor racing in the 1990s, and later Le Mans racing, but eventually used in the Porsche Carrera GT sports car; between 2003 and 2007. The engine is derived from the unsuccessful Porsche 3512 3.5-liter 80° V12 engine, used in the early 1990s.

Background 
A V10 replacement for the 3512 was in development at the time of Porsche's withdrawal from Formula One. This engine would not be completed until several years later, when it was modified for use in the stillborn Porsche LMP project in 2000. The engine eventually became mass-produced when a further variant was chosen as the powerplant of the Porsche Carrera GT supercar.

Technical specifications 

Porsche Carrera GT Engine
Layout: Longitudinal, rear mid-engine, rear-wheel-drive layout
Engine type: 68° V10, aluminium block and heads
Code: 980/01
Valvetrain: DOHC (chain-driven), 4 valves per cylinder (40 valves total), variable valve timing on intake camshafts, sodium-cooled exhaust valves
Bore × stroke: , Nikasil coated bores, forged titanium connecting rods, forged pistons
Displacement: 
Compression ratio: 12.0:1
Rated power:  @ 8,000 rpm
Max. torque:  @ 5,750 rpm
Specific output: 
Weight to power ratio: 
Power to weight ratio: 
Redline: 8,400 rpm

Applications

Road cars
Porsche Carrera GT (M80/01)

Race cars
Porsche LMP2000 (9R3)

References

Porsche
Engines by model
Gasoline engines by model
Formula One engines
Porsche in motorsport
V10 engines